Jenny Marie Nannecy Girard de Vasson (20 August 1872, La Châtre - 15 February 1920, Fougerolles) was one of the first notable women photographers in France. During her relatively brief career, she created over 5,000 images.

Biography 
The Girard de Vassons were an upper-class family, originally from Berry Her father was a magistrate, and several creative artists were among her parents' friends, including the author, George Sand. Initially, she studied drawing, with the painter, Bernard Naudin, who would remain a lifelong friend, although art never became more than a hobby. She first developed an interest in photography in 1899, and set up a small laboratory at home. During the following years, she travelled extensively, throughout France and Europe, returning from each trip  with a large collection of photographs.

Following the onset of World War I, she and her family retired to Berry, where she focused on photographing the rural villagers. Photography was always treated as a pleasurable passion, for her friends and family, rather than a conscious artistic process. She died, unmarried, at the age of forty-seven, from a heart condition.

In her will, she requested that all her writings, drawings, and everything that could be linked to an artistic activity, be destroyed after her death. She omitted to mention her photographs, because she considered them to be memories, not creative works. A large number were destroyed, however, during World War II, when her parents' home in Versailles was looted.

They were discovered in the early 1980s by the photographer, while working in Berry. He and three co-authors promoted her work in the book, Jenny de Vasson, une femme photographe au début du siècle, published in 1982 by Éditions Herscher.

Selected works

References

Further reading 
 Christian Caujolle, Yvon Le Marlec, Gilles Wolkowitsch, Jean-Marc Zaorski, Jenny de Vasson, une femme photographe au début du siècle, Paris, Herscher, 1982 
 Dominique Le Bas, Gilles Wolkowitsch, Jenny de Vasson, photographe, Clermont-Ferrand, Conseil général du Puy-de-Dôme éd., 1998
 Gilles Wolkowitsch, Le Monde de Jenny de Vasson, Lancosme-Multimédia éd., 2001 
 Gilles Wolkowitsch, Jenny de Vasson à Versailles, Lancosme-Multimédia éd., 2019

External links 

Biography @ the Galerie Paul Amarica

1872 births
1920 deaths
French photographers
French women photographers
People from Indre